Oleksandr Prokopovych Markevych, in English more often Aleksandr Prokofyevich Markevich (19 March 1905 – 23 April 1999) was a Ukrainian zoologist, and a prolific helminthologist and copepodologist. He was professor and an Academician of the National Academy of Sciences of Ukraine.

Biography
Markevych was born 19 March 1905 in the village of Ploske, Kyiv Governorate. His father Prokofiy Markevych served as a parish clerk in a rural church. His mother Maria Bordashevska came from a family of the impoverished nobility. During his studies at the Pedagogical Technical School (1921–1925) in Belaya Tserkov, he was engaged in research on ichthyology. He continued his studies at Kyiv University, where he worked in the laboratory of I. I. Schmalhausen and simultaneously at the biological station of the Ukrainian Soviet Socialist Republic Academy of Sciences, situated on the Dnieper River.

His keen interest in fish parasites led him to work at the Ichthyological Institute of the Lenin All-Union Academy of Agricultural Sciences in Leningrad (now the Research Institute of the Lake and River Fish Industry), where he completed his post-graduate studies under the guidance of professor V. A. Dogiel. In the 1930s a team of scientists at the Laboratory of Fish Diseases, headed by Dogiel, laid the foundations of Soviet ichthyoparasitology. At this laboratory the young Markevich began to study the then little known and very complicated group Copepoda parasitica, with extraordinary diligence and perseverance. He studied the fauna of this group living in lakes Ladoga and Onega, in the Caspian and Azov seas and in a number of smaller water bodies.

In 1935 he returned to Kyiv, where at first he headed the Invertebrate Morphology Department of the Zoological Institute, in the Ukrainian SSR Academy of Sciences, then in 1937 became head of the newly established Parasitological Department of that Institute.

Scientific career and publications
Markevich was one of the first Soviet parasitologists to begin a systematic study of fishpond culture. He was the first to publish that the dangerous fish parasite Chilodonella cyprini reproduces massively in the winter and not in the summer, as supposed earlier. His key papers described the new species of parasitic copepods
 Ergasilus briani Markevich, 1932
 Paraergasilus rylovi Markevich, 1937
 Ergasilus auritus Markewitsch, 1940
 Ergasilus anchoratus Markewitsch, 1946

After returning to Kyiv in 1935 Markevich continued his ichthyoparasitological investigations. In 1951 he published an extensive monograph on the parasite fauna of freshwater fishes of the Ukrainian SSR. This monograph received a strong response in the USSR and abroad. In 1963 it was published in English under the title "Parasitic Fauna of Freshwater Fish of the Ukrainian SSR". He continued to be actively interested in the research of Copepoda parasitica, and his latest monograph on the parasitic Copepoda of fish in the USSR was published for the Smithsonian Institution and the National Science Foundation (USA) by the Indian National Scientific Documentation Centre (1976).

Proceeding from a series of solid scientific works on fish parasites (ichtyoparasitology) he formulated some theoretical fundamentals after complex studies on parasites of aquatic animals (hydroparasitology). As part of a scientific program, he identified studies needed on the ecology and development of the parasites of aquatic animals, studies on their influence on their host and vice versa, and studies on their dependence on abiotic and biotic factors.

The theory of parasitocenosis, formulated by E. N. Pavlovsky, found a follower in A. P. Markevich. Attracted by Pavlovsky's concept of parasitocenosis, Markevich analyzed new facts obtained by parasitologists and microbiologists since Pavlovsky's publications, wrote several papers on this issue, and defined the task of parasitocenology as the "elucidation of objective patterns of life of parasitosymbiocenoses as well as biocenotic groupings of free-living parasite stages, in order to elaborate methods for directing the formation processes of parasitic communities"

Markevich e created a school of parasitologists in Ukraine and sparked the interest of a number of zoologists and botanists in the research of Carpathian fauna and flora. For several years he was Vice-president and later President of the Biological Sciences Department of the Ukrainian SSR Academy of Sciences. He also made outstanding contributions to the research of parasite fauna of fish in Egypt, where he worked as expert and professor at Cairo University (periodically 1964 to 1967).

International activities and honors
 In 1958 member of the delegation of the USSR to the Fifteenth International zoological congress in London (Great Britain).
 In 1959 visited Bulgaria, lecturing  on practical questions of the phylogeny of invertebrate animals in the University of Sofia.
 In 1964-1965 professor of the Zoology Department of the Faculty of Science at Cairo University.
 In 1966-1967 expert on questions of parasitology in the National Scientific Center of the Arabic Republic of Egypt (ARE).
 In 1967 appointed an honoured member of the Polish Society of Parasitologists.
 In 1969  selected member of Academy of Zoology of India.
 In 1969 appointed member of the International Commission of Protozoology.
 In 1970 he led a delegation of Soviet scientists to the Second International Congress of Parasitologists in Washington (USA).
 Editorial board member of the journals Angewandte Parasitologie (East Germany (GDR)) and Folia parasitologica (Czechoslovak Socialist Republic).

Bibliography
 Markevich, A. P., 1931, "Parasitische Copepoden und Branchiuren des Aralsees, nebst systematische Bemerkungen über die Gattung Ergasilus Nordmann", Zoologischer Anzeiger Volume: 96(5-6): 121-143, figs. 1-8. (1-x-1931);
 Markevich, A.P., 1933, "Tracheliastes soldatovi nov. sp., a new copepod parasitic on sturgeons of the Amur River", Bulletin of the Fan Memorial Institute of Biology, Zoology, Volume: 4(5):241-258, figs. 1-7, pl. 1. (English and Chinese);
 Markevich, A. P., 1934, Les maladies parasitaires des poissons de la Province de Leningrad, All-Union Cooperative United Publishing House, Leningrad and Moscow Volume: : 3-100;
 Markewitsch, A. P., 1934, "Die Schmarotzerkrebse der Fische der Ukraine", Annales Musei Zoologici Polonici, 10, 223-249;
 Markevich, A. P., 1934, "Descrizione di due specie nuove di Ergasilus provenienti della Russia (U.R.S.S.). Copepodi parassiti", Memorie della Società Entomologica Italiana Volume: 12:129-141, figs. 1-18;
 Markevich, A. P., 1936, "Il genere Basanistes Nordmann, 1832 (Copepodi parassiti)", Atti della Società Italiana della Scienze Naturali, Volume: 75:227-242, figs. 1-8;
 Markevich, A. P., 1937, Copepoda Parasitica of Freshwaters of USSR (Kiev: Akademii Nauk. Ukrainskoj SSR), 223 pp.;
 Маркевич О. П. - "Copepoda parasitica прісних вод СРСР", К., Вид-во АН УРСР, 1937, 222 с.; (Ukrainian)
 Маркевич А. П. - "Гельминтофауна рыб Днепра в районе Канева", Наукові записки Київського Гос.університета, 1949, Т. VIII, с. 8-12; (Russian)
 Маркевич О. П. - "Основи паразитологiї", К., 1950; (Ukrainian)
 Маркевич А. П. - "Паразитофауна пресноводных рыб УССР", К.: АН УССР, 1951; (Russian)
 Markevich, A. P. 1951. Parasitic fauna of freshwater fish of the Ukrainian S.S.R. Akademiya Nauk Ukrainskoi SSR, Institut Zoologii, Kiev, 375 pp. Translated from Russian by N. Rafael, Israel Program for Scientific Translations. Office of Technical Series, U.S. Department of Commerce, Washington, D.C. 388 pp.;
 Маркевич О. П., Короткий И. I. - "Визначник прісноводних риб УРСР", К., 1954; (Ukrainian)
 Маркевич А. П. - "Паразитические веслоногие рыб СССР", К., 1956; (Russian)
 Маркевич А. П. - "Развитие животного мира", ч. 1, К., 1957; (Russian)
 Markevich, A. P., 1959, "Parasitic copepods of fishes in the U.S.S.R. and the peculiarities of their distribution", In: Proceedings of the XV. International Congress of Zoology (London), Volume: : 669-671;
 Markevich, A. P., 1963, Parasitic fauna of freshwater fish of the Ukrainian SSR. Israel Program Scient. Trans. Jerusalem  Volume: :1-388, figs. 1-257. (Translation of: Markevich (= Markewitsch), A. P., 1956);
 Маркевич О. П. - "Фiлогенiя тваринного свiту". К., 1964; (Ukrainian)
 Markevich, A. P., 1976, Parasitic copepodes on the fishes of the USSR, Indian National Scientific Documentation Centre, New Delhi; for the Smithsonian Institution and the National Science Foundation, Washington, DC (English translation) Volume: 445 pp.;
 Маркевич А. П., Татарко  К. И. -  "Русско-украинско-латинский зоологический словарь. Терминология и номенклатура", К., "Наукова думка", 1983; (Russian)

Species named in Markevich's honour
Markevich's authority among colleagues, students and followers, is evident from the many organisms named in his honour:

 Asymphylodora markewitschi Kulakowskaja, 1947;
 Allocreadium markewitschi Kowal, 1949;
 Trypanosoma markewitschi Lubinsky et Salewskaja, 1950;
 Gyrodactylus markewitschi Kulakowskaja, 1952;
 Diorchis markewitschi Patschenko, 1952;
 Cryptobia markewitschi Schapoval, 1953;
 Myxobolus markewitschi Palij, 1953;
 Phyllodistomum markewitschi Pigulevsky, 1953;
 Helicometra markewitschi Pogorelzeva, 1954;
 Dactylogyrus markewitschi Gussev, 1955;
 Entamoeba markewitschi Chebotarev, 1956;
 Markewitschiellinae Skrjabin et Koval, 1957;
 Markevitschiella Skrjabin et Koval, 1957;
 Laelaspis markewitschi Pirianyk, 1958;
 Stephanoproraoides markewitschi Sharpilo L. et V., 1959;
 Pseudoxiphydria markewitschi Jermolenko, 1960;
 Charopinus markewitschi Gussev, 1961;
 Sphaerospora markewitschi Donec, 1962;
 Markewitschia Yamaguti, 1963;
 Diplozoon markewitschi Bychowsky, Gintovt et Koval, 1964;
 Pseudoanthocotyle markewitschi Nikolaeva et Pogorelzeva, 1965;
 Markewitschia Kulakowskaja et Achmerov, 1965;
 Chloromyxum markewitschi Butabayeva et Allamuratov, 1965;
 Henneguya markewitschi Allamuratov, 1965;
 Lepronyssoides markewitschi Vshivkov, 1965;
 Vitta alexandri Kornyushin, 1966;
 Lamproglena markewitschi Sukhenko et Allamuratov, 1966;
 Markewitschiana Allamuratov et Koval, 1967;
 Markewitschella Spassky et Spasskaja, 1972;
 Markewitschitaenia Sharpilo et Kornjuschin, 1975;
 Aeolosoma markewitschi Boshko et Pashkevichute, 1975;
 Heteronychia markewitschi Verves, 1975;
 Markevitschielinus Tytar, 1975;
 Paraergasilus markevichi Titar et Chernogorenko, 1982.
 
For helminths, he is honored by:
 Lopastoma markevichi Kurochkin et Korotaeva, in Polyanskij, 1982;

And for myxozoans:
 Ceratomyxa markewitchi Iskov et Karataev, 1984;
 Clariidae Kutikova, Markevich et Spiridonov, 1990 (Rotifera)

Biographic bibliography
 Мазурмович Б. М., Шульга І. К. - "Видатні вітчизняні зоологи" - К., "Радянська школа", 1953 - стор, pp. 193–194
 "Про організацію Українського республіканського товариства паразитологів", Вісник АН УРСР, №7, 1956 pp. 77–78
 Чеботарьов Р. С., Коваль В. П. - "Олександр Прокопович Маркевич", Труди Інституту зоології АН УРСР, т.13, 1956 pp. 101–109
 "Akademik A. P. Markevič" - "Mladý svět", 1959, №49
 Мазурмович Б. Н., Бошко Г. В. - "Научная, педагогическая и общественная деятельность академика АН УССР А. П. Маркевича", Паразиты человека и животных. – 1965. pp. 5–19
 "Akademik A. P. Markevič oslavil šedesátiny", "Veterinářstvi", 1965
 Dyk V., Kratochvil J. - "Šedesátiny akademika A. P. Markeviče", "Zoologické listy", 1965, №4, p. 384
 Eichler W. - "Aleksandr Procof'evič Markevič 60 Jahre alt", "Angew. Parasitologie", 1965, №1, pp. 1–2
 Мазурмович Б. М. - "Розвиток зоології в Київському університеті за 50 років радянської влади", Вісник Київського університету, №9, 1967 р.17-23
 "Akademik A. P. Markevič", "Bulletin VŠZ", 1967, №5
 Dyk V. - "Zlatá medaile VŠZ akademiku A. P. Markevičovi", "Acta Universit. agricult., Facult. veterinaria", 1968, №2, pp. 370–371
 Корнеев С. Г. - "Советские ученые - почетные члены иностранных научных учреждений" - М., "Наука", 1973, p. 66
 Писаренко Г.С. - "О. П. Маркевич", АН УРСР. Бібліографія вчених Української РСР - К., "Наукова думка" – 1975 р. 67
 Бошко Г. В., Засухин Д. Н. - "К 70-летию академика АН УССР А. П. Маркевича", Медицинская паразитология и паразитарные болезни. – 1975 pp. 113–115
 "К 75-летию академика АН УССР Александра Прокофьевича Маркевича", Паразитология, 1980, XIV, No. 6
 Романенко В. Д. - "Александр Прокофьевич Маркевич (К 80-летию со дня рождения)", Гидробиологический журнал, К., 1985 (отдельный оттиск), pp. 109–110
 "Академік Олександр Прокопович Маркевич. Життя і діяльність", НАНУ Інститут зоології ім. І. І. Шмальгаузена УНТП. Київ, "Наукова думка", 1999 р. 190
 Монченко В. И. - "Вклад академика А. П. Маркевича в зоологическую науку", Вестник зоологии, Отдельный выпуск, 19, часть 1, 2005 pp. 11–14
 Kornyushin V. V. - "Scientific and Practical Conference of the Ukrainian Scientific Society of Parazitologists Dedicated to Centenary of Academician of NAS of Ukraine A. P. Markevich", Vestnik Zoologii, Volume 39, No. 6 (November–December, 2005), pp. 87–88

Resources of the Internet

 Александр Прокофьевич Маркевич 1905—1999 Українське наукове товариство паразитологів.
 Маркевич, Александр Прокофьевич Большая биографическая энциклопедия.
 Маркевич Александр Прокофьевич БСЭ
 НАН України Інститут зоології ім. Шмальгаузена
  Глоба Ольга Федорівна -  УЧЕНІ-ПРИРОДОЗНАВЦІ КИЇВЩИНИ
   Ольга Кратко - Становлення наукового світогляду професора МАРКЕВИЧА О. П.
   Ольга Кратко - Маркевич Олександр Прокопович (1905-1999 рр.) – організатор українського республіканського товариства паразитологів
 Науково-практична конференція укр. наукового товариства паразитологів, присвячена 100-річчю з дня народження акад. НАН УКРАЇНИ О. П. МАРКЕВИЧА
 George Hanek and William Threlfall, "Ergasilus auritus Markewitsch, 1940 (Copepoda: Ergasilidae) from Gasterosteus aculeatus Linnaeus, 1758 in Newfoundland" // Canadian Journal of Zoology, Volume 48, Number 1, January 1970, Pages 185-187
 Hoda El-Rashidy; Geoffrey A. Boxshall  Biogeography and phylogeny of Paraergasilus Markevich, 1937
 Stephen Alston, Geoffrey A. Boxshall and John W. Lewis, "A redescription of adult females of Ergasilus briani Markewitsch, 1933 (Copepoda: Poecilostomatoida)" // Systematic Parasitology, 1993, Volume 24, Number 3, pp. 217-227
  Alston S, Boxshall GA & Lewis JW (1996) " The life cycle of Ergasilus briani Markewitsch, 1933 (Copepoda: Poecilostomatoida)" // Systematic Parasitology 35: 79-110
 Turkiye Parazitoloji Dergisi  2007, Cilt 31, Sayı 2, Sayfa(lar) 158-161
 The World of Copepods - Smithsonian National Museum of Natural History

References 

Members of the National Academy of Sciences of Ukraine
Soviet parasitologists
20th-century Ukrainian zoologists
Soviet zoologists
Scientists from Kyiv
1905 births
1999 deaths
Ukrainian parasitologists
Laureates of the State Prize of Ukraine in Science and Technology
Soviet expatriates in Egypt